This is the progression of world record improvements of the 3000 metres M55 division of Masters athletics.  Records must be set in properly conducted, official competitions under the standing IAAF rules unless modified by World Masters Athletics.

The M55 division consists of male athletes who have reached the age of 55 but have not yet reached the age of 60, so exactly from their 55th birthday to the day before their 60th birthday.
Key

References

Masters Athletics 3000 m list

Masters athletics world record progressions